The 1994 NBA Finals was the championship round of the National Basketball Association (NBA)'s 1993–94 season, and the culmination of the season's playoffs. The Western Conference champion Houston Rockets played the Eastern Conference champion New York Knicks for the championship, with the Rockets holding home-court advantage in the best-of-seven series. The Rockets defeated the Knicks 4 games to 3 to win the team's first NBA championship.

This matchup was Hakeem Olajuwon's second NBA Finals appearance, his other being in 1986, where Larry Bird and the Boston Celtics defeated the Houston Rockets four games to two. The series was Patrick Ewing's first NBA Finals appearance. The Rockets came in with strong determination to win not only the franchise's first NBA championship, but the city's first championship in a league that still existed, while the Knicks were looking to add a third NBA championship trophy, as the Knicks' last trophy came from the 1973 NBA Finals. The Knicks also hoped to impress their new owners Viacom, who had just bought Paramount Communications (formerly Gulf+Western), their longtime owners (after the series however, Viacom sold the Knicks and the rest of the Madison Square Garden properties).

The series was hailed as a meeting of the two great centers who had previously played for a championship in college. In 1984 while Olajuwon was with the University of Houston and Ewing was with Georgetown University, Georgetown had beaten Houston 84–75 in the 1984 NCAA Championship game. In this series, however, Olajuwon outperformed Ewing, outscoring him in every game of the series and posting numbers of 26.9 ppg on 50.0% shooting compared to Ewing's 18.9 ppg on 36.3% shooting. However, Ewing set an NBA finals record in the series with a total of 30 blocks, and he tied the single-game record of 8 blocks in Game 5. Tim Duncan would later set the record for most blocks in a Finals series (2003) with 32 blocks in six games while Dwight Howard would set the record for most blocked shots in a Finals game with 9 blocked shots in Game 4 of the 2009 Finals while with the Orlando Magic.

During the series, the Houston Rockets played seven low-scoring, defensive games against the New York Knicks. After splitting the first two games in Houston, the Knicks won two out of three games at Madison Square Garden, which also hosted the Rangers first Stanley Cup celebration in 54 years during the series.

In addition, the Knicks set a record for most playoff games played in one season, with 25. The Boston Celtics, coached by Doc Rivers, would surpass it during their championship season of 2008 when they played 26.

The Rockets beat the Knicks in Game 7, 90–84, enabling the city of Houston to not only celebrate its first NBA and fifth professional sports championship (first in an existing league), but also deny New York from having both NBA and NHL championships in the same year (Chicago had suffered this fate two years earlier in 1992, with the Bulls winning their second NBA championship and the Blackhawks losing in the Stanley Cup Finals). For his efforts Olajuwon was named NBA Finals Most Valuable Player. For the Knicks, Riley had the unfortunate distinction of having become the first (and to this date, the only) coach to lose a Game 7 NBA Finals on two teams, having lost to the Celtics in 1984. It also denied him the distinction of being the first coach to win a Game 7 NBA Finals with two teams, having defeated the Detroit Pistons in 1988.

NBC Sports used Ahmad Rashad (Knicks sideline) and Hannah Storm (Rockets sideline). Marv Albert and Matt Guokas called the action.

Hal Douglas narrated the season-ending documentary Clutch City for NBA Entertainment.

Background

Houston Rockets

The Rockets chose Hakeem Olajuwon as the first overall pick in the 1984 NBA draft.

By his tenth season, Olajuwon became a more complete player, and he led the Rockets to a 15–0 start en route to a 58–24 record. But after a four-game defeat of the Portland Trail Blazers in the first round, they blew a pair of big fourth quarter leads at home and lost to the Phoenix Suns to begin the second round (in the process earning a derisive nickname of 'Choke City' by the Houston Chronicle).

In response, the Rockets used the headline as motivation, overcoming a 0–2 deficit to defeat the Suns in seven games (earning the nickname 'Clutch City'). In the conference finals, Houston defeated the Utah Jazz in five games to claim their third conference title. Olajuwon won the MVP and Defensive Player of the Year awards at season's end.

New York Knicks

Like Olajuwon, Patrick Ewing was a first overall pick of the NBA draft. Ewing was picked by the Knicks in the 1985 draft, and won Rookie of the Year that season. But despite earning All-Star accolades of his own, the Knicks teams he played with only made it past the first round twice during his first six seasons (in 1989 and 1990).

In the 1991 off-season, the Knicks hired Pat Riley as head coach. In contrast to the fast-paced style of Showtime he used with the Los Angeles Lakers, Riley decided to go for a more deliberate and physical approach in New York. Aided by the likes of Charles Oakley, Anthony Mason, John Starks and Charles Smith, Ewing and the Knicks rose to prominence under Riley, and in 1994, they won 57 games to finish second in the Eastern Conference.

Their playoff run began with a 3–1 victory over their cross-river rival New Jersey Nets. However, they had a hard time disposing a Chicago Bulls team that lost Michael Jordan to retirement (which lasted until the final months of the following season), but managed to win all four home games to advance. In the conference finals, they were pitted against the upstart Indiana Pacers, who were led by Reggie Miller. Though the Pacers gave the Knicks a scare, the latter's experience proved too much as they won the series in seven games.

Road to the Finals

Regular season series
The Houston Rockets won both games in the regular season series:

1994 NBA Finals rosters

Houston Rockets

New York Knicks

Series summary

Game 1

Game 2

Game 3

Game 4

Game 5

Game 6

Game 7

Olajuwon vs. Ewing
Although most fans in New York, and some members of the national media, blamed John Starks' poor performance, who shot 2-for-18 from the field in Game 7, as a contributing factor in the Knicks' loss in the series, another important factor in the Rockets series win was Olajuwon's performance. Olajuwon outscored Ewing in every game of the series, while Ewing outblocked (4.3 to 3.9 bpg) and outrebounded him (12.4 rpg to 9.1 rpg). Ewing set a then NBA Finals record with a total of 30 blocks.

Player statistics

Houston Rockets

|-
| align="left" |  || 2 || 0 || 13.5 || .200 || .286 || .500 || 3.0 || 0.0 || 0.5 || 0.5 || 4.0 
|-
| align="left" |  || 7 || 0 || 22.6 || .422 || .438 || .926 || 3.1 || 2.9 || 1.3 || 0.3 || 10.0 
|-
| align="left" |  || 1 || 0 || 2.0 || .000 || .000 || .000 || 0.0 || 0.0 || 0.0 || 0.0 || 0.0 
|-
| align="left" |  || 7 || 0 || 11.3 || .250 || .400 || .833 || 1.0 || 1.0 || 0.3 || 0.1 || 2.4 
|-
| align="left" |  || 7 || 0 || 17.3 || .579 || .000 || .750 || 3.6 || 0.4 || 0.4 || 0.1 || 7.1 
|-
| align="left" |  || 7 || 7 || 37.9 || .324 || .306 || .619 || 6.1 || 3.7 || 1.3 || 0.6 || 10.3 
|-
| align="left" |  || 3 || 0 || 2.3 || .000 || .000 || .000 || 0.3 || 0.0 || 0.0 || 0.0 || 0.0 
|-
| align="left" |  || 7 || 7 || 37.7 || .365 || .225 || .682 || 3.3 || 2.9 || 0.6 || 0.0 || 13.4 
|-! style="background:#FDE910;"
| align="left" |  || 7 || 7 || 43.1 || .500 || 1.000 || .860 || 9.1 || 3.6 || 1.6 || 3.9 || 26.9 
|-
| align="left" |  || 7 || 7 || 25.4 || .389 || .357 || 1.000 || 1.4 || 3.1 || 0.7 || 0.0 || 5.6 
|-
| align="left" |  || 7 || 7 || 39.6 || .519 || .000 || .500 || 11.3 || 3.3 || 0.9 || 0.0 || 9.3 

New York Knicks

|-
| align="left" |  || 7 || 0 || 11.4 || .323 || .125 || 1.000 || 0.9 || 2.4 || 0.4 || 0.1 || 3.3 
|-
| align="left" |  || 2 || 0 || 5.5 || 1.000 || .000 || .000 || 1.0 || 0.0 || 0.0 || 0.0 || 2.0 
|-
| align="left" |  || 5 || 0 || 7.6 || .200 || 1.000 || .500 || 0.4 || 0.4 || 0.0 || 0.2 || 1.6 
|-
| align="left" |  || 7 || 7 || 44.0 || .363 || .200 || .714 || 12.4 || 1.7 || 1.3 || 4.3 || 18.9 
|-
| align="left" |  || 7 || 7 || 38.0 || .467 || .436 || .824 || 3.0 || 6.0 || 2.4 || 0.1 || 16.4 
|-
| align="left" |  || 7 || 0 || 29.3 || .468 || .000 || .640 || 6.9 || 1.3 || 0.7 || 0.0 || 8.6 
|-
| align="left" |  || 7 || 7 || 40.7 || .484 || .000 || .833 || 11.9 || 2.4 || 1.1 || 0.1 || 11.0 
|-
| align="left" |  || 7 || 7 || 26.7 || .441 || .000 || .684 || 4.3 || 1.7 || 0.6 || 1.0 || 9.3 
|-
| align="left" |  || 7 || 7 || 41.9 || .368 || .320 || .769 || 3.1 || 5.9 || 1.6 || 0.1 || 17.7 
|-
| align="left" |  || 4 || 0 || 1.8 || .000 || .000 || .000 || 0.0 || 0.0 || 0.0 || 0.3 || 0.0

Telecast interruption
During Game 5, most NBC affiliates split the coverage of the game between NFL Hall of Famer O. J. Simpson's slow speed freeway chase with the LAPD. At the time, Simpson had been an NFL analyst on NBC.

The coverage was presented on a split screen, with the game taking up the smaller portion of the television screen on the left, while live coverage of the chase was shown in a bigger screen on the right. The audio came from the chase as narrated by NBC News anchor Tom Brokaw.

KNBC in Los Angeles, serving the media market where the police were tracking Simpson, left the Game 5 broadcast completely for the chase with local coverage narrated by Paul Moyer and Colleen Williams; the station did not even put up a split screen until the end of the game, which was still close at the time. By this point, Simpson had returned to his mansion in Brentwood and had surrendered to police.

A complete re-broadcast of Game 5, with natural crowd audio substituting for the parts for which NBC did not provide audio, is part of the DVD release of this series from Warner Home Video.

Aftermath
The Rockets would repeat as NBA champions in 1995 although their season record wasn't so promising. Plagued by a lack of chemistry, the Rockets were stuck in the middle of the conference standings most of the year. Then, as the NBA's trading deadline approached, on February 14, 1995, the Rockets acquired Hakeem Olajuwon's "Phi Slama Jama" teammate Clyde Drexler. The Rockets finished the regular season as the 6th seed but the team on the court at season's end was clearly better than its 47–35 record. The new Rockets team had only had about two months to gel. The playoffs started rough for Houston, the team down 2 games to 1 to Utah in the First Round. However, the Rockets battled back and won that series, stealing the deciding Game 5 in Utah. The Rockets' ability to overcome adversity became more evident as the postseason wore on. They beat four 50-win squads (Utah, Phoenix, San Antonio and Orlando) to win the NBA championship, becoming the lowest seed ever to win it all.

Also in 1995, the Knicks enjoyed another strong season, with 55 wins. However, they were eliminated in seven games by the Indiana Pacers during the second round as Pacers guard Reggie Miller's 'Knick Killer' legacy continued. After the season Pat Riley left the Knicks after they balked at his request for a stake in ownership and the role of team president in negotiations for an extension. He departed for the Miami Heat, with whom he would win three championships, one as the head coach and two as its president. The Knicks would make the NBA Finals again in 1999 as the first eighth seed to make the Finals, but fell to the Spurs in five games, and have not returned since.

Before this victory, only the Houston Oilers' AFL two championships at the close of the 1960 season and 1961 season and the Houston Aeros' two WHA Avco World Trophies in 1974 and 1975 represented Houston's only professional championships. The 1994 NBA Championship represented the city of Houston's first professional championship since those two teams, and the first in a league that did not later merge.

This was the last NBA Finals for three of the league's longest-tenured and most recognizable referees: Darell Garretson, Jack Madden and Jake O'Donnell. Garretson and Madden retired following the 1994 Finals, while O'Donnell worked the 1994-95 season, but did not work past the second round of the playoffs, marking the first time since 1971 O'Donnell did not officiate in the championship series. O'Donnell retired in December 1995 following the end of a lockout of NBA referees by Commissioner David Stern.

Overall, as of 2019, Houston's teams in the "Big Four" major professional sports are 6–1 over their New York City counterparts in terms of playoff series. The Rockets, in addition to their 1994 triumph, also defeated the Knicks in the 1975 Eastern Conference First Round. The NFL's Houston Oilers (now Tennessee Titans) followed with a victory over the New York Jets in the 1991 AFC wild card round, and the Houston Astros later prevailed over the New York Yankees in three MLB postseason series during the 2010s (2015 ALWC, 2017 ALCS, 2019 ALCS) The only time a New York-based team prevailed over Houston was in the 1986 NLCS, when the New York Mets won over the then-NL member Astros.

See also
1993–94 New York Knicks season
1993–94 Houston Rockets season
1994 NBA Playoffs
1994 Stanley Cup Finals

References

National Basketball Association Finals
Finals
NBA
NBA
NBA Finals
NBA Finals
NBA Finals
Basketball competitions in New York City
Basketball competitions in Houston
NBA Finals
GMA Network television specials
1990s in Manhattan